\/ may refer to:

 an escaped slash character
 \/, ASCII symbol for the boolean "or" operator, formed with a backslash and a slash
 The ALGOL 68 boolean "or" operator
 \/, the boolean "or" operator in early K&R C in Unix V6, Unix V7 and more recently BSD 2.11
 the letter "V"